An arsenal is a place where arms and ammunition are made, maintained and repaired, stored, or issued, in any combination, whether privately or publicly owned. Arsenal and armoury (British English) or armory (American English) are mostly regarded as synonyms, although subtle differences in usage exist.

A sub-armory is a place of temporary storage or carrying of weapons and ammunition, such as any temporary post or patrol vehicle that is only operational in certain times of the day.

Etymology

Types
A lower-class arsenal, which can furnish the materiel and equipment of a small army, may contain a laboratory, gun and carriage factories, small-arms ammunition, small-arms, harness, saddlery tent and powder factories; in addition, it must possess great storehouses. In a second-class arsenal, the factories would be replaced by workshops. The situation of an arsenal should be governed by strategic considerations. If of the first class, it should be situated at the base of operations and supply, secure from attack, not too near a frontier, and placed so as to draw in readily the resources of the country. The importance of a large arsenal is such that its defences would be on the scale of those of a large fortress.

In the early 21st century, the term "floating armoury" described a ship storing weapons to be supplied to merchant vessels in international waters subject to piracy, so that the weapons do not enter territorial waters where they would be illegal.

Operational subdivision

The branches in a great arsenal are usually subdivided into storekeeping, construction and administration:

 Under storekeeping the arsenal should have the following departments and stores: Departments of issue and receipt, pattern room, armoury department, ordnance or park, harness, saddlery and accoutrements, camp equipment, tools and instruments, engineer store, timber yard, breaking-up store, and unserviceable store.
 Under construction: Gun factory, carriage factory, laboratory, small arms factory, harness and tent factory, gunpowder factory, etc. In a second-class arsenal there would be workshops instead of factories.
 Under the head of administration would be classed the chief director of the arsenal, officials military and civil, non-commissioned officers and military artificers, civilian foremen, workmen and laborers, with the clerks and writers necessary for the office work of the establishments.

In the manufacturing branches are required skill, and efficient and economical work, both executive and administrative; in the storekeeping part, good arrangement, great care, thorough knowledge of all warlike stores, both in their active and passive state, and scrupulous exactness in the custody, issue and receipt of stores. Frederick Taylor introduced command and control techniques to arsenals, including the U.S.'s Watertown Arsenal (a principal center for artillery design and manufacture) and Frankford Arsenal (a principal center for small arms ammunition design and manufacture).

See also

 Armorer
 Arsenal Academy
 Arsenal, Mainz
 Dresden Armory
 Eddystone Arsenal
 Frankford Arsenal
 Halifax Armoury
 Harpers Ferry Armory
 Imperial Arsenal (Ottoman Empire) 
 Kremlin Armoury
 Magazine (artillery)
 Naval Group (France)
 Picatinny Arsenal
 Pine Bluff Arsenal
 Rock Island Arsenal
 Royal Arsenal (UK)
 Royal Armouries (UK)
 Spandau Arsenal
 Springfield Armory
 Venetian Arsenal
 Watertown Arsenal
 Watervliet Arsenal
 Zeughaus (Berlin)

References

External links

Military installations